Henricus Hondius II (1597 – 16 August 1651) was a Dutch engraver, cartographer, and publisher.

Life 
He was born in Amsterdam, the son of the famous cartographer Jodocus Hondius who had started a map-making business in the city. Henricus obtained the original plates of the Mercator 1569 world map, and published a 1606 version of it. After his father died in 1612 Henricus co-ran the business with his brother-in-law. In 1621 opened his own company in his hometown. The first time his name was mentioned in an atlas was in 1623 when he published the fifth edition of the Mercator-Hondius atlas. After 1628 Henricus partnered with the cartographer Jan Janssonius and together they continued the business. He died in Amsterdam.

He came from a different family from Hendrik Hondius I; there were two families engaged in very similar activities at the same time.

Works

References

Further reading 

 Nadine Orenstein, Hendrick Hondius and the Business of Prints in Seventeenth-century Holland, Sound & Vision Interactive, 1996, 
 Martin Woods. "Antarctic World Views; Henricus Hondius, Polus Antarcticus; Nicholas Visscher, A new and very accurate map of the world", National Library of Australia, Mapping our World: Terra Incognita to Australia, Canberra, National Library of Australia, 2013.

External links 

 

17th-century cartographers
1597 births
1651 deaths
Artists from Amsterdam
Dutch cartographers
Dutch Golden Age printmakers